This article details the qualifying phase for rowing at the 2016 Summer Olympics. The majority of the spots were awarded based on the results at the 2015 World Rowing Championships, held at Lac d'Aiguebelette, France from August 30 to September 6, 2015. Places gained there were awarded to National Olympic Committees, not to specific athletes. Further berths are distributed to the nations at four continental qualifying regattas in Asia and Oceania, Africa, Latin America, and Europe (with the additional participation of the United States, Canada, Australia, and New Zealand), the latter being the final Olympic qualification regatta in Lucerne, Switzerland. In July 2016, four Russian crews were removed because of doping concerns, and FISA announced which NOCs would replace them.

Summary

Timeline

Men's events

Single sculls

Information updated after choices made by NOCs after Latin American qualification regatta.

Double sculls

Lightweight double sculls

+ EGY won LM2x and M1x at Continental Qualification Regatta, but NOC had to decide which boat to confirm for the Games due to the one-boat quota rule on each gender at the Continental Qualification Regatta.  EGY chose M1x, hence LM2x place went to ANG.

Information updated after choices made by NOCs after Latin American qualification regatta.

BEL chose M1x after European Qual Regatta, hence LM2x place went to DEN.

Quadruple sculls

 Russia were disqualified on 1 July 2016 following the nullification of all results following a failure in an anti-doping test by Sergey Fedorovtsev. Their quota place was transferred to New Zealand.

Pair

Four

Lightweight four

Eight

Women's events

Single sculls

Information updated after choices made by NOCs after Latin American qualification regatta.

Double sculls

Lightweight double sculls

Quadruple sculls

Pair

Eight

References

Qualification
Qualification for the 2016 Summer Olympics